Naya Baradwar is a town and a nagar panchayat in Janjgir-Champa district in the Indian state of Chhattisgarh.

Demographics
 India census, Naya Baradwar had a population of 10262. Males constitute 51% of the population and females 49%. Naya Baradwar has an average literacy rate of 66%, higher than the national average of 59.5%: male literacy is 77%, and female literacy is 55%. In Naya Baradwar, 14% of the population is under 6 years of age.

References

Cities and towns in Janjgir-Champa district